Mahsas may refer to:

 Ahmed Mahsas, an Algerian militant in the nationalist movement against French colonization
 Mahsas, a village in Boumerdès Province within Algeria
 Salim Mahsas, an Algerian footballer

See also  
 Mahsa (disambiguation)

Arabic-language surnames